Soy formula is a substitute for human breast milk. It is a commercial product based on the proteins found in soybeans. Soy infant formula uses processed soybeans as its source of protein, and comes in powdered or liquid form. Usually lactose-free, soy infant formula contains a different sugar. Infants who are intolerant of cows’ milk protein may also be intolerant of soy protein. It differs from human breast milk in a number of ways. Soy protein inhibits the absorption of iron. The soy-based formulas discussed by the World Health Organization reports that soy formula is fortified with iron to compensate for this effect. One naturally occurring plant-based compound found in soy-based infant formula is phytic acid. It is also a strong inhibitor of iron absorption, though it can be removed in processing. It is not known how many manufacturers of soy-based formula incorporate this practice. China and Vietnam have regulated soy-based infant formulas to include NaFeEDTA (sodium-feric ethylenediaminetetraacetic acid) to fortify the formula and enhance the absorption of iron by the infant. When iron compounds are added to soy-based infant formula, the iron compound is encapsulated to prevent it from making the formula dark.

Constituents
Genetically modified ingredients may be present in soy-based infant formula. It may also be of lower nutritional value. Soy-based infant formula can have aluminum, phytates, and phytoestrogens (isoflavones) that might cause unanticipated effects. Other constituents are amino acids: such as taurine, methionine, and carnitine. Added minerals are phosphore, calcium, iron, and zinc. SIF also contains soy-isolate that supplies 95% of protein.

Indications
Breastfeeding is still the best option for feeding infants. There are instances when breastfeeding is not possible and the use of formula is appropriate.

Indications for the use of soy-based infant formula are galactosaemia and lactase deficiency. When a child develops an allergy to cows' milk, soy-based formula is used. SBF is less costly than other breast milk formula substitutes.

History
Past reports of the effects of soy formula have suggested that a constituent of soy formula may affect reproductive functions. However, studies have shown that no correlation exists between the consumption of soy formula and abnormality in reproductive anatomy or function. Soy-based infant formula has been used for over the past 100 years. By late 1800s and the early 1900s, supplementation of breastfeeding with formula was acceptable. Soy-based formula was used as early as 1909.

Allergies and other concerns
Soy-based infant formula is associated with allergies in infants. Chronic food protein-induced enterocolitis syndrome (FPIES) has been observed in infants aged younger than three months who were fed with soy formula. France has taken soy-based infant formula off the market. Soy-base formula accounts for about 20% of the infant formula purchased in the US. In New Zealand formula use is around 10%, and in Belgium and the UK and about 5%.

See also

Breast milk jewelry
Lactivism
Baby Gaga
Allergies in children

References

External links
 Using Wikipedia for Research

Infant formula
Baby products
Babycare
Breastfeeding
Soy-based foods
Soy products
Soybeans
Neonatology